"Summer Song" is a single by guitarist Joe Satriani, released in 1992 through Relativity Records. The Australian edition of the single contains two instrumental tracks from his Grammy-nominated fourth studio album The Extremist, with "Summer Song" reaching No. 5 on the U.S. Billboard Mainstream Rock chart. A music video was also released, where Satriani is seen playing the guitar with his band. The music video opens with the band on stage at a demolition derby. The video is tinted orange. Joe Satriani plays guitar with his band as the cars drives by.

Track listing

European edition

Australian edition

In popular culture
In Indonesia, "Summer Song" was used during the intro of One Stop Football, which was broadcast by Trans7 from 2006 to 2011.

References

Joe Satriani songs
1992 songs
Rock instrumentals
1990s instrumentals